Seppo Lehto (born 6 September 1962 in Kuru) is a Finnish nationalist, currently living in Tampere. The main theme of his activism is the return of Finnish territories ceded to the Soviet Union in World War II. He also claims to lead several organizations. He has also drawn Mohammed caricatures.

Lehto has hosted a podcast called Patrioottiradio, and become well known for creating numerous blogs to disparage politicians and members of racial, ethnic and religious minorities.

On 30 May 2008, the Tampere District Court sentenced Lehto to two years and five months imprisonment. Lehto was charged with nine counts of gross defamation, inciting ethnic hatred and religious blasphemy against Islam. The defamations included sexual slander towards the victims, claiming the victims to be guilty of fabricated crimes and writing disturbing material as if they were written by the victims (Identity theft). Some blog entries were also inciting violence against the victims. Over 40 blog sites were closed by the court's decision. Lehto had previously served a suspended sentence for defamation and was under probation, which means that his three-month sentence will become mandatory.

On 3 October 2013, Speaker of the Parliament announced that Seppo Lehto is not anymore welcome to the Parliament House of Finland after he performed a Nazi salute there and published a photo of the act on the Internet. His host, Finns Party member of the parliament James Hirvisaari, was also expelled from the Finns Party due to this event.

Lehto's attempts to enter politics through elections have been unsuccessful.

References

External links 
 Iltasanomat: Syyttäjä: Lehdon herjaamien kannattaa pyytää tietojen poistamista itse 

1962 births
Living people
21st-century Finnish criminals
Finnish male criminals
People from Ylöjärvi
Finnish bloggers
People from Tampere
Finnish nationalists
Critics of Islam
People convicted of racial hatred offences